In linguistics, a calque or loan translation is a word or phrase borrowed from another language by literal word-for-word or root-for-root translation. When used as a verb, "to calque" means to borrow a word or phrase from another language while translating its components, to create a new lexeme in the target language. For instance, the English word "skyscraper" was calqued in dozens of other languages. Another notable example is the Latin weekday names, which came to be associated by ancient Germanic speakers with their own gods following a practice known as : the Latin "Day of Mercury",  (later "" in modern French), was borrowed into Late Proto-Germanic as the "Day of Wōđanaz" (*Wodanesdag), which became  in Old English, then "Wednesday" in Modern English.

The term calque itself is a loanword from the French noun  ("tracing, imitation, close copy"), while the word loanword is a calque of the German noun . Calquing is distinct from phono-semantic matching: while calquing includes semantic translation, it does not consist of phonetic matching—i.e., of retaining the approximate sound of the borrowed word by matching it with a similar-sounding pre-existing word or morpheme in the target language.

Proving that a word is a calque sometimes requires more documentation than does an untranslated loanword because, in some cases, a similar phrase might have arisen in both languages independently. This is less likely to be the case when the grammar of the proposed calque is quite different from that of the borrowing language, or when the calque contains less obvious imagery.

Types 
One system classifies calques into five groups. This terminology is not universal.
 Phraseological calques: idiomatic phrases are translated word for word. For example, "it goes without saying" calques the French .
 Syntactic calques: syntactic functions or constructions of the source language are imitated in the target language, in violation of their meaning. 
 Loan-translations: words are translated morpheme by morpheme, or component by component, into another language. 
 Semantic calques (also known as semantic loans): additional meanings of the source word are transferred to the word with the same primary meaning in the target language. As described below, the "computer mouse" was named in English for its resemblance to the animal; many other languages have extended their own native word for "mouse" to include the computer mouse.
 Morphological calques: the inflection of a word is transferred. Some authors call this a morpheme-by-morpheme translation.

Some linguists refer to a phonological calque, in which the pronunciation of a word is imitated in the other language. For example, the English word "radar" becomes the similar-sounding Chinese word , which literally means "to arrive (as fast) as thunder".

Partial

Partial calques, or loan blends, translate some parts of a compound but not others. For example, the name of the Irish digital television service "" is a partial calque of that of the UK service "Freeview", translating the first half of the word from English to Irish but leaving the second half unchanged. Other examples include "liverwurst" (< German ) and "apple strudel" (< German ).

Semantic 
The "computer mouse" was named in English for its resemblance to the animal. Many other languages use their word for "mouse" for the "computer mouse", sometimes using a diminutive or, in Chinese, adding the word "cursor", making  "mouse cursor".. At least 35 languages have their own versions of the English term.

Examples 

The common English phrase "flea market" is a loan translation of the French  ("market of fleas"). At least 22 other languages calque the French expression directly or indirectly through another language.

Another example of a common morpheme-by-morpheme loan-translation is of the English word "skyscraper", which may be calqued using the word for "sky" or "cloud" and the word, variously, for "scraping", "scratching", "piercing", "sweeping", "kissing", etc. At least 54 languages have their own versions of the English word.

History 

 

 Another phenomenon of hybridization is the creation in a language of a new word, derived or composed with the help of elements already existing in that language, and which is not distinguished in any way by the external aspect of the older words, but which, in fact, is only the copy (calque) of a word existing in the mother tongue of the one who tries out a new language. [...] we want to recall only two or three examples of these copies (calques) of expressions, among the most certain and the most striking. [...]

Since at least 1926, the term calque has been attested in English through a publication by the linguist :

 [...] Such imitative forms are called  (or ) by French philologists, and this is a frequent method in coining abstract terminology, whether nouns or verbs.

See also 

 Anglicism
 Chinese Pidgin English
 Cognate
 Gallicism
 Germanism
 Inkhorn term
 Loanword
 Metatypy
 Semantic loan
 Translation
 Wasei-eigo
 Engrish

References 
Notes

Bibliography
 Kasparek, Christopher. 1983. "The Translator's Endless Toil." The Polish Review 28(2):83–87.
 Robb: German English Words
 Zuckermann, Ghil'ad. 2003. Language Contact and Lexical Enrichment in Israeli Hebrew. Palgrave Macmillan. 
  2009. "Hybridity versus Revivability: Multiple Causation, Forms and Patterns." Journal of Language Contact (2):40–67.

External links 

 EtymOnline
 Merriam Webster Online

Etymology
 

sv:Lånord#Översättninglån